Édel de Cléron is a traditional French cheese of relatively recent origin which carries the name of the village where it is made, Cléron, in the valley of the Loue of the Doubs department in Franche-Comté.

 By its taste, form and texture, it is close to a Vacherin Mont-d'Or. 
 It is made from lightly pasteurized cow's milk from the Doubs department. It is made all year long.
 It is surrounded by a band, and packaged in a box, of natural aromatic pine bark from the Jura mountains.

Notes and references 
L'Edel de Cleron - Cheese Library
This article is based on the equivalent article from the French Wikipedia, retrieved on July 25, 2008.

French cheeses
Cow's-milk cheeses